Peltodytes festivus is a species of crawling water beetle in the family Haliplidae. It is found in North America.

References

Haliplidae
Beetles described in 1876